Mark Nwagwu is a Nigerian poet, columnist and Professor of cell molecular biology at the University of Ibadan. His work has appeared on Vanguard, The Punch, ThisDay and Premium Times.

Early life and career
Nwagwu was born in Obaetiti, Nguru Aboh Mbaise in Imo State. He served as a senior lecturer at the University of Ibadan until his retirement in 2002. He is also a Fellow at Nigerian Academy of Science.

Bibliography 
Write Me A Poem (2021)
Time Came Upon Me and Other Poems  (2019)
HelenaVenus (2013)
Cat Man Dew (2012)
Helen Not-of-Troy (2009)

References

1937 births
Living people
Igbo academics
University of Ibadan alumni
Nigerian academics
Nigerian poets
Nigerian male poets
Fellows of the Nigerian Academy of Science